Ekkapan Wannasut is a Thai singer and winner of KPN Award Thailand singing contest in 2010. He is from Roi Et and is a former recipient of a scholarship (that was under the royal patronage of Princess Galyani Vadhana) at Rangsit University.

References

Ekkapan Wannasut
Year of birth missing (living people)
Living people
Place of birth missing (living people)
Ekkapan Wannasut